The 2019–2020 Toyota Finance 86 Championship (named the 2019–20 Best Bars Toyota 86 Championship for sponsorship reasons) will be the seventh running of the Toyota Finance 86 Championship. The championship will begin on 2 November 2019 at Pukekohe Park Raceway and will conclude on 26 April 2020 at the same venue.

Teams and drivers 
All teams are New-Zealand registered.

Calendar 
The 2019–20 calendar was announced on 30 April 2019. Each round will have three races each, with qualifying taking place for both races one and three.

References

External links
 

Toyota Finance 86 Championship
Toyota Finance 86 Championship
Toyota Finance 86 Championship